The Football New South Wales National Training Centre is run by the Football Federation Australia in conjunction with Football New South Wales, in Sydney, for Australian youth players. Up to 2013 the NSWIS ran this program for both men and women.

Program
The men's program aims to prepare players for selection in the Australia U17 squad and Australian Institute of Sport program. 22 scholarships are awarded each year to athletes who are 15–17 years old that show the potential to represent Australia at U-17 level.

The women's program aims to improve the skills of nationally identified U20 and senior athletes.

There is also a Northern program for both men and women, which awards scholarships to athletes in the northern and more remote areas of New South Wales. This program is based on the same criteria as those of the central programs.

New South Wales Premier Youth League
The men's program currently plays every year in the New South Wales Premier Youth League. The competition runs from February to August and fields U-20 teams from clubs who are competing in the corresponding senior men's competition, the New South Wales Premier League. Unlike its AIS counterpart, in the Victorian Premier League, the NSWIS team does not compete for points.

Notable former players

Players capped at full international level are marked in bold.

Men

Women

References

External links
Official website
 NNSW Football profile
NSW Premier Youth League 2008 results

Soccer in New South Wales
Soccer clubs in New South Wales
Football (Soccer)